Spirama is a genus of moths in the family Erebidae first described by Achille Guenée in 1852.

Description
Antennae usually minutely fasciculate (bundled) in the male. Tibia not hairy and mid-tibia spined. Palpi with second joint reaching vertex of head and third joint naked. Thorax and abdomen smoothly clothed with hair. Forewings with nearly rectangular apex. Hindwings with vein 5 from lower angle of cell, which is rather short.

Defensive display

Some of the species, such as S. helicina, S. indenta, S. recessa, S. remota and S. sumbana, have a pattern on the wings that looks like the frontal view of the face of a snake with slightly opened mouth. This pattern is more clearly discernible in females. It may intimidate potential predators and dissuade them from attacking.

Species
 Spirama biformis Hulstaert, 1924
 Spirama capitulifera Prout, 1919
 Spirama euphrages Prout, 1924
 Spirama euspira (Hubner, 1823)
 Spirama glaucescens Butler, 1893
 Spirama griseisigma Hampson, 1913
 Spirama helicina Hübner, [1831]
 Spirama inconspicua Herrich-Schäffer, [1854]
 Spirama indenta Hampson, 1891
 Spirama kalaoensis Swinhoe, 1904
 Spirama miniata Wallengren, 1856
 Spirama paecila (Guenée, 1852)
 Spirama recessa Walker, 1858
 Spirama remota Felder, 1861
 Spirama retorta Clerck, 1764
 Spirama sumbana Swinhoe, 1904
 Spirama triloba Guenée, 1852
 Spirama voluta Felder & Rogenhofer, 1874

Former species
Spirama obscura Cramer, 1780 was moved to the genus Speiredonia in 2005.
 Spirama revolvens (Walker, 1858)

References

External links
 
 
"ハグルマトモエ Spirama helicina (Hübner, [1831])". Digital Moths of Japan.

 
Hypopyrini
Moth genera